The 1990 Wyoming gubernatorial election took place on November 6, 1990. Incumbent Democratic Governor Mike Sullivan ran for re-election. In the general election, he faced Republican nominee Mary Mead, a businesswoman and the daughter of former U.S. Senator and Governor Clifford Hansen. Owing to Sullivan's personal popularity, he won re-election over Mead in a landslide, marking the fifth straight Democratic victory in Wyoming's gubernatorial races, a streak that has yet to be broken by either party.

Democratic primary

Candidates
Mike Sullivan, incumbent Governor
Ron Clingman, mechanic

Results

Republican primary

Candidates
Mary Mead, businesswoman and daughter of former Governor Clifford Hansen
Nyla Murphy, State Representative

Results

Results

References

Wyoming
1990
Gubernatorial